Rodrigo Garro (born 4 January 1998) is an Argentine professional footballer who plays as an attacking midfielder for Talleres de Córdoba.

Career
Garro started out with Fundación Leo Messi, spending three years with them before joining Atlético de Rafaela's academy in 2014 and subsequently Instituto's in 2017. He made his opening appearances in professional football in February 2018, starting Primera B Nacional encounters against Villa Dálmine, Gimnasia y Esgrima and Los Andes as the club reached the promotion play-offs in 2017–18; though lost out to Sarmiento.

In January 2022, Garro joined Argentine Primera División club Talleres de Córdoba on a deal until the end of 2025.

Career statistics
.

References

External links

1998 births
Living people
Argentine footballers
People from Santa Rosa, La Pampa
Association football midfielders
Association football forwards
Primera Nacional players
Argentine Primera División players
Instituto footballers
Talleres de Córdoba footballers